Miss Israel is a national beauty pageant in Israel. The pageant was founded in 1950, where the winners were sent to Miss Universe. The pageant was also existing to send delegates to Miss World, Miss International, Miss Europe and Miss Asia Pacific International.

History
In the late 1920s, a "Queen Esther Beauty Pageant" was held in Tel Aviv, centred on the holiday of Purim. The first Miss Israel took place in 1950, two years after Israel's independence. 

From then onwards, Miss Israel was the national franchise holder for Miss Universe, Miss World, and Miss International. The pageant's official winner represented Israel at Miss Universe and the runners-up at Miss World, Miss International, and Miss Europe. The winner also occasionally competed at other international pageants, such as Miss World in 1953, 1968, 1992, 1996–1998; Miss International in 1963; Miss Asia Pacific International; and Miss Earth.

In 2022, the pageant was cancelled amid controversies over its relevance to modern social standards.

Pageant Rules
All contestants were required to be female, 170 centimetres or taller, between 18 to 24 years old, never married, and with no children.

International crowns 
 One – Rina Mor (winner, Miss Universe 1976) 
 One – Linor Abargil (winner, Miss World 1998) 
 One – Lilach Ben-Simon (winner, Miss Europe 1994)
 Two – Miss Asia Pacific International:
Nurit Mizrachi (winner, 1985)
Tali Ben-Harush (winner, 1992)

Grand slam franchise holders
Miss Universe (1952—2022)
Miss World (1952—2017)
Miss International (1960—2005)
Miss Earth (2003—2009)

Track records

Miss Universe
On 20 July 2021, Miss Universe confirmed that the competition would be held in the Israeli city of Eilat in December 2021.

Notable winners
1951 — Michal Harʾel, former honorary president of the Women's International Zionist Organization and member of the World Jewish Congress
1958 — Miriam Hadar, finalist at Miss Universe
1999 — Rana Raslan, first Arab and Muslim to win the title
2004 — Gal Gadot, actress
2005 — Elena Ralph, first winner to be placed at Miss Universe since 2001
2013 — Yityish Titi Aynaw, first Ethiopian Jew to win the title

Audience favorites 
In some years, spectators at home were able to choose their favorite contestant by SMS:
 2000 — Nirit Bakshi
 2003 — Shahar Nehorai
 2004 — Keren Friedman
 2005 — Jennifer Bop
 2008 — Shunit Faragi
 2018 — Emma Eytan
 2019 — Maya Barsheshet
 2020 — Tali Krasnopolski
 2021 — Alin Gurevich

Hosts 
 Shaike Ophir (1954)
 Alexander Yahalomi (1957)
 Uri Zohar (1960)
 Rivka Michaeli (1963, 1965, 1989)
 Meni Peer (1972, 1973) 
 Dudu Topaz (1991)
 Hanny Nahmias (1992, 1993)
 Mike Burstyn (1992)
 Sapir Koffman (1993)
 Miki Kam (1994)
 Gilat Ankori (1996)
 Noa Tishby (1997, 1998) 
 Alon Reinhorn (1998)
 Lion Rosenberg (1999)
 Yael Abecassis (2000)
 Aki Avni (2001, 2002)
 Yael Bar Zohar (2004)
 Orna Datz (2005)
 Raz Meirman (2005)
 Orna Datz (2006)
 Galit Gutmann (2007, 2008, 2009)
 Guy Zu-Aretz (2009
 Hilla Nachshon (2010, 2011)
 Ilanit Levi (2014)
 Titi Aynaw (2016)
 Shani Hazan (2017)
 Reef Neeman (2021)

Judges
 Binyamin Gibli (1973)
 Lea Gottlieb (1973)
 Ora Namir (1989)
 Rina Mor (1989, 2004))
 Dorit Jellinek (1997)
 Galit Gutmann (2001)
 Judy Shalom Nir-Mozes (2003) 
 Ronit Yudkevitz (2005)
 Judy Shalom Nir-Mozes (2005)
 Michal Yannai (2007)
 Yael Goldman (2008)
 Sivan Klein (2008)
 Yael Bar Zohar (2011)
 Michaela Bercu (2012)
 Sivan Klein (2012)

Venue 
 International Convention Center
 Menora Mivtachim Arena
 Cinerama theater
 Haifa International Convention Center

Titleholders

Categories
 Winner International Title 
 Miss Universe Israel
 Miss World Israel
 Miss International Israel
 Miss Europe Israel
 Miss Earth Israel
 Miss Asia Pacific Israel
 Miss Young Israel

1950-1959
The Miss Israel divided into five categories; "Malkat Hayofi" - Israel’s Beauty Queen (IBQ) is usually for the main winner, "Na’arat Israel" – Israel’s Maiden of Beauty (IMB) is for a second place, "Malkat Hachen" - Israel’s Queen of Grace (IQG) is for a third place, "Malkat Hayofi-Esreh" - Israel’s Teen Queen (ITQ) is for fourth place and "Nesichat Hayofi" - Israel’s Princess of Beauty (IPB) is for the last of Top 5 Miss Israel which means a fifth place. These titles represent Israel at International competitions such as Miss Universe, Miss World, Miss International, Miss Europe, Miss Earth and other minor pageants.

1960-2021

Titleholders under Miss Israel org.

Miss Universe Israel

Since 1952, Israel competes at major international pageants. Israel has three international winners namely; Miss Universe 1976, Miss World 1998 and Miss Europe 1994 According to the Miss Israel Organization, traditionally Miss Israel represents the country at Miss Universe. In 2006 Miss Israel changed format with the grand winner competing in the Miss World competition and second place automatically declared "Miss Universe Israel." In 2013, the winner competed in Miss Universe 2013 in Russia. Began in 2018 the format was back to past era; the main winner goes to Miss Universe.

See also
 LaIsha
 Israeli fashion
 Culture of Israel

References

External links

 missisrael.ynet.co.il

 Miss Israel
1950 establishments in Israel
Annual events in Israel
Beauty pageants in Israel
Israeli awards
Israeli television shows
Israel
Recurring events established in 1950